The Menace is a 1961 French-Italian drama film directed by Gérard Oury.

Cast 
 Robert Hossein - Savary
 Marie-José Nat - Josépha
 Paolo Stoppa - Cousin
 Robert Dalban - L'inspecteur
  - Le commissaire
 Gérard Oury - Le docteur
 Elsa Martinelli - Lucile
 Alice Sapritch - La cliente

References

External links 

1961 drama films
1961 films
Italian drama films
French drama films
1960s French films
1960s Italian films